Frederick Dove (27 September 1917 – 19 June 1980) was an English competitive swimmer who represented Great Britain at the Olympics and European championships, and England in the British Empire Games, during the 1930s.  Dove competed in freestyle swimming events. Dove was born in Royal Tunbridge Wells.  He was a member of Monson Swimming club and Otter swimming club.

In the 1936 Summer Olympics in Berlin, whilst suffering from a viral infection, he was eliminated in the first round of the men's 100-metre freestyle. At the 1934 British Empire Games in London, he participated in the 100-yard freestyle competition and finished fourth.  Four years later at the 1938 British Empire Games in Sydney, he was part of the English men's team which won the gold medal in the 4×220-yard freestyle relay, as well as in the 3×110 yards medley event.

See also
 List of Commonwealth Games medallists in swimming (men)

External links

References

1917 births
1980 deaths
People from Royal Tunbridge Wells
English male freestyle swimmers
Olympic swimmers of Great Britain
Swimmers at the 1936 Summer Olympics
Swimmers at the 1934 British Empire Games
Swimmers at the 1938 British Empire Games
Commonwealth Games gold medallists for England
European Aquatics Championships medalists in swimming
Commonwealth Games medallists in swimming
Medallists at the 1938 British Empire Games